Pantheon may refer to:

 Pantheon (religion), a set of gods belonging to a particular religion or tradition, and a temple or sacred building

Arts and entertainment

Comics
Pantheon (Marvel Comics), a fictional organization
Pantheon (Lone Star Press), a comic book series
Pantheon, a 2010 four-issue comic book limited series by IDW Publishing

Gaming
Pantheon (role-playing game), a 2000 book
Pantheon: Rise of the Fallen, a massively multiplayer online role-playing game
Pantheon, an unreleased computer game by Frog City Software

Other uses in arts and entertainment
 Panthéon (album), by Booba, 2004
 "Pantheon", a song by InMe from the 2012 album The Pride
 Pantheon (book), a 12th century book by Gottfried von Viterbo
 The Pantheon, a 1798 collection of written pieces compiled by Nikolay Karamzin
 Pantheon Books, a Random House imprint
 Pantheon (film), a 2017 French short film
 Pantheon (TV series), a 2022 American animated drama TV series 
 Pantheon, Rome (photograph), a 1990 Thomas Struth photograph

Buildings and memorials
 Pantheon, Rome, Italy, a Catholic church and former Roman temple
 Panthéon, Paris, France, a monument 
 Place du Panthéon, a square
 Pantheon, London, England, an 18th-century place of entertainment
 Pantheon of Illustrious Men, a royal site in Madrid, Spain
 Pantheon of National Revival Heroes, a Bulgarian national monument and ossuary
 Pantheon, Moscow, Russia, a planned but uncompleted memorial tomb
 Pantheon Theatre, Vincennes, Indiana, U.S.
 National Pantheon, Portugal, a national monument and tomb in Lisbon
 National Pantheon of Venezuela, a burial place and former church in Caracas
 National Pantheon of the Heroes, a national monument in Asunción, Paraguay
 Khojivank Pantheon of Tbilisi, an Armenian architectural complex in Tbilisi, Georgia
 Komitas Pantheon, a cemetery in Yerevan, Armenia
 Mtatsminda Pantheon, a necropolis in Tbilisi, Georgia
 Didube Pantheon, a cemetery in Tbilisi, Georgia
 Saburtalo Pantheon, a necropolis in Tbilisi, Georgia
 Panteón Nacional Román Baldorioty de Castro, a burial place in Ponce, Puerto Rico
 National Pantheon of the Dominican Republic, a former church and burial place in Santo Domingo
 Panteón de Marinos Ilustres, a naval memorial in Cadiz, Spain
 Panteón de San Fernando, a burial place in Mexico City
 Tancredo Neves Pantheon of the Fatherland and Freedom, a monument in Brasília, Brasil

Other uses
 Pantheon (desktop environment), a Linux desktop environment
 Pantheon (mythical creature), a mythical or imaginary creature used in heraldry, particularly in Britain
 Pantheon (roller coaster), at Busch Gardens Williamsburg, U.S.
 Pantheon (software), a web development platform
 Pantheon, a production company established by Jean-Pierre Isbouts

See also

Panthea (disambiguation)
Parthenon (disambiguation)
Parthenon, a former temple on the Athenian Acropolis, Greece
 Panthéon Club, a political group of the French Revolution
Pantheon Fossae, a geological feature on Mercury
Pantheon High, a manga